This is an inventory of military equipment of the Syrian Arab Army.  
The organization and military doctrine of the Syrian Armed Forces followed a mix of French and Western influences as the Soviet Union closely guarded its operational principles and never shared them with client states. The Syrian Arab Army has traditionally relied on the Russian Federation and its predecessor the Soviet Union as its main supplier of military equipment. As a result of the Syrian Civil War, many vehicles and much heavy equipment has been destroyed or captured, with some stores being partially replenished from Russian stocks. Accurate numbers for equipment in the Army's inventory are difficult to ascertain. The numbers listed below should be regarded as optimistic estimates. Some armored vehicles were lost in past decades without being accounted for, while many others were not operational (or even beyond repair) at the start of the Syrian Civil War due to being in long-term storage with minimal or no maintenance. Given these factors, it has been estimated that more realistic estimates would be about 33% lower than what is listed below.

Individual equipment

Pistols

Carbines

Assault rifles

Sniper rifles

Light machine guns

Medium machine guns

Heavy machine guns

General-purpose machine guns

Submachine guns

Grenades

Grenade launchers

Mines

Anti-tank

MANPADS 
Combined total of 5,000+ launchers.

Vehicles

Tanks

Infantry fighting vehicles

Armoured personnel carriers

Military engineering

Logistics and utility vehicles

Artillery

Mortars

Field artillery

Self-propelled field artillery

Multiple launch rocket systems

Anti-air guns and systems

Towed anti-aircraft artillery

Towed air defence

Self-propelled air defence

Ballistic missiles

Tactical ballistic missiles

Command posts

Higher level command posts

Unmanned aerial vehicles

Non-combat unmanned air vehicles

References

External links
 Syria Land Forces military equipment and vehicles Syrian Army
 Army Equipment

Military equipment of Syria
Syria
Equipment